The 1960–61 Montreal Canadiens season was the 52nd season in club history. The team placed first in the regular season to qualify for the playoffs. The Canadiens were eliminated in semi-finals by the Chicago Black Hawks 4 games to 2.

Regular season

Final standings

Record vs. opponents

Schedule and results

Playoffs

Semi-finals

Player statistics

Regular season
Scoring

Goaltending

Playoffs
Scoring

Goaltending

Awards and records
 Hart Memorial Trophy: Bernard Geoffrion
 Art Ross Trophy: Bernard Geoffrion
 James Norris Memorial Trophy: Doug Harvey

Transactions

See also
 1960–61 NHL season

References
Canadiens on Hockey Database
Canadiens on NHL Reference

Montreal Canadiens seasons
Mon
Mon